Clay Coton is a village in West Northamptonshire in England. The population (including Elkington and Stanford-on-Avon) of the civil parish at the 2011 census was 271. The village is close to the M1 Motorway with its junction (known as Catthorpe Interchange with the M6 and A14 road which runs very close to the north.

The village is dominated by the mediaeval former church of St. Andrew. Built in 1340, it was restored by Edmund Francis Law in 1866 but fell into disuse in the 1950s and was renovated as a private house in 2000. However, the surrounding graveyard still has public access.

Until 2002, despite the small size of the village, it included a pub, called the 'Fox and Hounds'; it was later renamed the 'Fox'. The Fox was renowned for its folk music nights and cask ales. Like the church, it has now been converted to a private house.

External links

References 

Villages in Northamptonshire
West Northamptonshire District